Lady Glenorchy's Church or Chapel in Edinburgh was a curious quoad sacra parish church founded in the 18th century, with an unusual history, both due to its enforced relocation caused by the building of Waverley Station and the splitting of the church in the Disruption of 1843.

History

The chapel was founded by Willielma Campbell, Viscountess Glenorchy. Her husband James Campbell had died in 1771 and she was left very wealthy. Under the influence of several people, in particular Rowland Hill's sister she became a major patron of the Church of Scotland both in her financial support of ministers and in her construction of several chapels, built at her own expense. In Edinburgh this led to the building of "Lady Glenorchy's Chapel" on an odd piece of ground between the Old Town to the south, and the first vestiges of the New Town to the north. The extremely low-lying ground was previously part of the garden ground of Edinburgh's Orphan Hospital. The new church lay midway between the orphan hospital to the north-west, and the medieval Trinity College Kirk to the south-east. Building began in 1772 and was completed in 1774, and at that time the Nor Loch still stood to the west.

Somewhat late in the process (when the building was largely complete) Lady Glenorchy wrote to the Rev John Drysdale in his capacity as Moderator of the General Assembly of the Church of Scotland in April 1774 seeking the approval of the Presbytery and explaining that the church was expressly aimed at the poor of the city and the alleviation of the overcrowded city churches. The Assembly were by no means comfortable with the arrangement and initially forbade ministers within Scotland from preaching there, forcing Lady Glenorchy to choose Presbyterian ministers from England. The chapel opened for worship in May 1774 with the first service being taken by visiting local ministers: Rev Robert Walker of St Giles and Rev Dr John Erskine of Greyfriars.

The first map showing the structure dates from 1778 (see right). It illustrates a simple box, somewhat larger than the adjacent Trinity College Church, with an entrance porch on the west side, in the traditional pattern. It held up to 2000 people.

Very unusually, the church was not under the control of the Church of Scotland but was ministered by Church of Scotland ministers. Lady Glenorchy was under full personal control until 1786 when, six months before her death, she transferred control to five trustees, all elders of the church.

From 1830 the idea of a railway station on the site was mooted and James Bonar WS (one of the elders) took control of the legalities and constructed an excellent deal with the railway company for the rebuilding, not only of the church, but also for a new orphan hospital and the careful dismantling and rebuilding of Trinity College Church. The fate of the original church was sealed by the Act of Parliament of 1836 which cleared the site for the building of Waverley Station but Bonar's web of contracts firmly protected the church's needs.

The protracted legal agreements were overtaken by other events and the congregation were still on site at the Disruption of 1843 when the Free Church split from the established Church of Scotland. In this particular instance the bulk of the congregation joined the Free Church, and the funds from the railway company were used to build Lady Glenorchy's Free Church at Greenside, Edinburgh (by John Henderson) which was completed in 1846.

From 1843 to 1846 the Free Church section of the congregation had met in the school hall of the Royal High School until completion of the new church in Greenside in 1846. It had a congregation of 750 at this point.

However, this left the established Church of Scotland portion of the congregation without a home, and a three-way legal debate began between the railway company and the two halves of the congregation (as the railway company had never intended to agree to build two churches). This was eventually resolved in 1856 when the Church of Scotland congregation found premises on Roxburgh Place to the south. James Bonar (although now in the Free Church) resolved this issue and the congregation formally moved to Roxburgh Place in 1859.

From 1900 the Church of Scotland and Free Church of Scotland partially reunified and the two buildings were thereafter known as Lady Glenorchy's North Church and Lady Glenorchy's South Church. The latter building was rebuilt in 1913 to designs by Peter MacGregor Chalmers and is now used as the Roxburgh Assembly Rooms.

Ironically, the only picture of Lady Glenorchy's Chapel dates from 1846 (right) and was taken by Hill & Adamson whose studio was only 100m away. The photo is misidentified in some sources as "the orphan hospital", which had already relocated to Dean Orphanage as the first use to decant the site in the 1830s (again under the skilful guidance of James Bonar who secured a truly spectacular building at railway company cost). The misidentification appears to stem from being the last remaining building within the orphanage grounds.

All but the facade of Lady Glenorchy's Free Church was demolished in 1986 and the facade now forms the frontage of the Glasshouse Hotel.

Burials

As the surrounding ground remained in use by the orphan hospital it was not used for burial. The nearby Old Calton Burial Ground served the needs of the parish. The only known burial was Lady Glenorchy herself, buried in the floor of the chapel in 1786. When the church was demolished she was exhumed. At some point she was re-interred at Roxburgh Place but was exhumed again in 1972 when the church was deconsecrated.

Ministers
From the late 1820s the uncertainty of the church's future caused its ministry to be fragmented, with much sharing of the role (and risk)

Francis Sherriff 1777 to 1778
Thomas Snell Jones 1779 to 1837 (an astounding ministry of 58 years)
Greville Ewing 1793 to 1798
John Purves 1826 to 1830
James Begg 1830/31
Thomas Liddell 1831 to 1841 moved to Canada
George Ramsay Davidson 1842 to 1843 moved to Lady Glenorchy's Free Church

Roxburgh Place
Daniel McLaren 1863 to 1874
John Grigor 1874 to 1876
Andrew Fyfe Burns 1877 to 1882
Thomas Burns 1882 to 1920

Lady Glenorchy's Free Church, Greenside Place
George Ramsay Davidson 1843 to 1890
Second charge Alexander Cusin 1865 to 1890 (son-in-law of G R Davidson)
James Harvey 1890 onwards

Notable congregation members
James Bonar Sr an elder in 1808
James Bonar WS and Alexander Bonar elders from 1830 and their brothers Horatius Bonar and Andrew Bonar
James Donaldson founder of Donaldson's School for the Deaf
John Tawse WS, Bonar's business partner

References

Churches in Edinburgh